Statistics of Bulgarian State Football Championship in the 1941 season.

Overview
It was contested by 11 teams, and PFC Slavia Sofia won the championship. The 1941 season was the first A PFG season to include teams from Vardar Macedonia, Western Thrace or the parts of Greek Macedonia under Bulgarian administration during much of World War II.

First round

|}

Quarter-finals

|}
1The replay was originally finished 1–1.

Semi-finals

|}

Final

First game

Second game

References
Bulgaria - List of final tables (RSSSF)

Bulgarian State Football Championship seasons
1
1